Spelling Bee of Canada is a charitable, educational spelling bee organization founded by Julie Spence in the Greater Toronto Area in 1987. As of 2022, over 70,000 children have participated in the competition.

The SBOC holds an annual spelling competition for children 6–14 years of age. Participants are divided into three age categories: primary, 6–8; junior, 9–11; and intermediate, 12–14.  15+ students will become mentors to participants in their region.

Though SBOC operates primarily in Ontario, contestants from other provinces are allowed to register and have competed in the past.

Julie Spence founded SBOC in order to engage parents and children.  Spelling bees were popular in Jamaica where she grew up, and she recalls realizing during the competitions "how much [it] brought people together".  She is happy with the growth of SBOC but disappointed by the extremely low number of black participants, and she has encountered many black parents who do not want their children to compete.  Veronica Taylor, a Barbadian-born mental health counsellor and the president of SBOC's Hamilton chapter, is also concerned about the lack of black participation, saying that black parents are not encouraging their children but letting them decide if they want to compete.  Laurel Broten, Ontario's Minister of Education, praised the SBOC for helping children in the primary, junior and intermediate age ranges improve their vocabulary and public speaking.  "As Minister of Education, I understand the importance of the work you do to help youth across Ontario enrich their learning and build self-confidence," she said.

Competitions 

The 2014 SBOC finals took place on 11 May 2014 at the Eaton Chelsea in Toronto. The regional competition in April 2014 had 3,000 participants, 84 of whom went on to the finals. The championship title comes with over $10,000 in cash prizes. This year's competition also marks the opening of three new regional chapters; the Aga Khan Education Board, Khalsa School of British Columbia, and the Toronto Community Housing chapter.

Rogers TV Spelling Bee of Canada 28th Championship had its finals on Sunday May 3, 2015 at The Ismaili Centre - Social Hall, 49 Wynford Dr., Toronto. 91 contestants competed in the finals. New additions to this year's regional competitions include; Toronto Bayview and Sheppard's YMCA, British Columbia's IWE Learning Centre and the Cultural Youth Initiative in Edmonton.

Rogers TV Spelling Bee of Canada 29th Championship finals were held on Sunday May 15, 2016 at the Ismaili Centre again. 93 participants from the 31 regional competitions competed in this year's finals. New additions to this year's regional competitions include a First Nation's chapter from Saskatchewan, and a new chapter from British Columbia – showing the increasing popularity in the spelling bee.

For the first time, due to the Covid-19 Pandemic, in 2020, the regional finals, as well as the National Championships, were held in virtual Zoom meetings, and the National Finals were on a livestream on November 29, 2020. This stream was livestreamed on CBC Sports, as well as a feature on CBC Gem, and is available on Spelling Bee of Canada's YouTube channel as of December 2020. This same procedure was taken for the 2021 Bee livestream 

Since 2020, the Chapter Spelling Bees have been transitioned to Regional/District Spelling Bees virtually. The first-place winner from the Regional Spelling Bee Competitions competes at the National Championships. 

The 35th Annual Championships will be returning back in person for the first time since 2019 before the pandemic. The national spelling bee will be live-streamed on CBC Sports and hosted at the Beeton Hall at the Toronto Reference Library on Sunday, June 12, 2022.

List of Winners

References

Spelling competitions
Competitions in Canada
English language in Canada
Educational organizations based in Ontario
Recurring events established in 1987
1987 establishments in Ontario
Spring (season) events in Canada